Hải Châu is an urban district (quận) of Da Nang in the South Central Coast region of Vietnam. This is the administrative, cultural and commercial center of the city. The city hall, the main theater and main market are located in Hải Châu.

Administration
Hải Châu is one of the central districts of Da Nang. Da Nang Bay lies north of the district, Thanh Khê district lies to the west, Sơn Trà and Ngũ Hành Sơn districts lie to the east, and Cẩm Lệ district lies to the west and south.

Hải Châu is administratively divided into 13 ward (phường):
 Hải Châu 1
 Hải Châu 2
 Thạch Thang
 Thanh Bình
 Thuận Phước
 Hòa Thuận Đông
 Hòa Thuận Tây
 Nam Dương
 Phước Ninh
 Bình Thuận
 Bình Hiên
 Hòa Cường Bắc
 Hòa Cường Nam

As of 2003 the district had a population of 197,118. The district covers an area of 21 km². The district capital lies at Phước Ninh ward.

References

Districts of Da Nang